PHD finger protein 21A is a protein that in humans is encoded by the PHF21A gene.

Function 

BHC80 is a component of a BRAF35 (MIM 605535)/histone deacetylase (HDAC; see MIM 601241) complex (BHC) that mediates repression of neuron-specific genes through the cis-regulatory element known as repressor element-1 (RE1) or neural restrictive silencer (NRS) (Hakimi et al., 2002).[supplied by OMIM]

Interactions 

PHF21A has been shown to interact with:
 HDAC1, 
 HMG20B, 
 Histone deacetylase 2,  and
 RCOR1.

References

Further reading

External links 
 

Transcription factors